Planetary science (or more rarely, planetology) is the scientific study of planets (including Earth), celestial bodies (such as moons, asteroids, comets) and planetary systems (in particular those of the Solar System) and the processes of their formation. It studies objects ranging in size from micrometeoroids to gas giants, aiming to determine their composition, dynamics, formation, interrelations and history. It is a strongly interdisciplinary field, which originally grew from astronomy and Earth science, and now incorporates many disciplines, including planetary geology, cosmochemistry, atmospheric science, physics, oceanography, hydrology, theoretical planetary science, glaciology, and exoplanetology. Allied disciplines include space physics, when concerned with the effects of the Sun on the bodies of the Solar System, and astrobiology.

There are interrelated observational and theoretical branches of planetary science. Observational research can involve combinations of space exploration, predominantly with robotic spacecraft missions using remote sensing, and comparative, experimental work in Earth-based laboratories. The theoretical component involves considerable computer simulation and mathematical modelling.

Planetary scientists are generally located in the astronomy and physics or Earth sciences departments of universities or research centres, though there are several purely planetary science institutes worldwide. Generally, planetary scientists study one of the Earth sciences, astronomy, astrophysics, geophysics, or physics at the graduate level and concentrate their research in planetary science disciplines. There are several major conferences each year, and a wide range of peer-reviewed journals. Some planetary scientists work at private research centres and often initiate partnership research tasks.

History
The history of planetary science may be said to have begun with the Ancient Greek philosopher Democritus, who is reported by Hippolytus as saying The ordered worlds are boundless and differ in size, and that in some there is neither sun nor moon, but that in others, both are greater than with us, and yet with others more in number. And that the intervals between the ordered worlds are unequal, here more and there less, and that some increase, others flourish and others decay, and here they come into being and there they are eclipsed. But that they are destroyed by colliding with one another. And that some ordered worlds are bare of animals and plants and all water.

In more modern times, planetary science began in astronomy, from studies of the unresolved planets. In this sense, the original planetary astronomer would be Galileo, who discovered the four largest moons of Jupiter, the mountains on the Moon, and first observed the rings of Saturn, all objects of intense later study. Galileo's study of the lunar mountains in 1609 also began the study of extraterrestrial landscapes: his observation "that the Moon certainly does not possess a smooth and polished surface" suggested that it and other worlds might appear "just like the face of the Earth itself".

Advances in telescope construction and instrumental resolution gradually allowed increased identification of the atmospheric as well as surface details of the planets. The Moon was initially the most heavily studied, due to its proximity to the Earth, as it always exhibited elaborate features on its surface, and the technological improvements gradually produced more detailed lunar geological knowledge. In this scientific process, the main instruments were astronomical optical telescopes (and later radio telescopes) and finally robotic exploratory spacecraft, such as space probes.

The Solar System has now been relatively well-studied, and a good overall understanding of the formation and evolution of this planetary system exists. However, there are large numbers of unsolved questions, and the rate of new discoveries is very high, partly due to the large number of interplanetary spacecraft currently exploring the Solar System.

Disciplines
Planetary science studies observational and theoretical astronomy, geology (astrogeology), atmospheric science, and an emerging subspecialty in planetary oceans, called planetary oceanography.

Planetary astronomy
This is both an observational and a theoretical science. Observational researchers are predominantly concerned with the study of the small bodies of the Solar System: those that are observed by telescopes, both optical and radio, so that characteristics of these bodies such as shape, spin, surface materials and weathering are determined, and the history of their formation and evolution can be understood.

Theoretical planetary astronomy is concerned with dynamics: the application of the principles of celestial mechanics to the Solar System and extrasolar planetary systems. Observing exoplanets and determining their physical properties, exoplanetology, is a major area of research besides Solar System studies. Every planet has its own branch.

Planet: Subject: Named after (NB: these terms are rarely used)
 Mercury: Hermology: Hermes
 Venus: Cytherology: Cytherea
 Earth: Geology: Gaia
 Moon: Selenology: Selene
 Mars: Areology: Ares
 Ceres: Demeterology: Demeter
 Jupiter: Zenology: Zeus
 Saturn: Kronology: Kronos
 Uranus: Uranology: Uranus
 Neptune: Poseidology: Poseidon
 Pluto: Hadeology: Hades
 Eris: Eridology: Eris

Planetary geology 

In planetary science, the term geology is used in its broadest sense, to mean the study of the surface and interior parts of planets and moons, from their core to their magnetosphere. The best known research topics of planetary geology deal with the planetary bodies in the near vicinity of the Earth: the Moon, and the two neighbouring planets: Venus and Mars. Of these, the Moon was studied first, using methods developed earlier on the Earth. Planetary geology focuses on the celestial objects that exhibit a solid surface or have significant solid physical states as part of their structure. Planetary geology applies geology, geophysics and geochemistry to planetary bodies.

Planetary Geomorphology 

Geomorphology studies the features on planetary surfaces and reconstructs the history of their formation, inferring the physical processes that acted on the surface. Planetary geomorphology includes the study of several classes of surface features:
 Impact features (multi-ringed basins, craters)
 Volcanic and tectonic features (lava flows, fissures, rilles)
 Glacial features
 Aeolian features
 Space weathering – erosional effects generated by the harsh environment of space (continuous micro meteorite bombardment, high-energy particle rain, impact gardening). For example, the thin dust cover on the surface of the lunar regolith is a result of micro meteorite bombardment.
 Hydrological features: the liquid involved can range from water to hydrocarbon and ammonia, depending on the location within the Solar System. This category includes the study of paleohydrological features (paleochannels, paleolakes).

The history of a planetary surface can be deciphered by mapping features from top to bottom according to their deposition sequence, as first determined on terrestrial strata by Nicolas Steno. For example, stratigraphic mapping prepared the Apollo astronauts for the field geology they would encounter on their lunar missions. Overlapping sequences were identified on images taken by the Lunar Orbiter program, and these were used to prepare a lunar stratigraphic column and geological map of the Moon.

Cosmochemistry, geochemistry and petrology

One of the main problems when generating hypotheses on the formation and evolution of objects in the Solar System is the lack of samples that can be analysed in the laboratory, where a large suite of tools are available and the full body of knowledge derived from terrestrial geology can be brought to bear. Direct samples from the Moon, asteroids and Mars are present on Earth, removed from their parent bodies and delivered as meteorites. Some of these have suffered contamination from the oxidising effect of Earth's atmosphere and the infiltration of the biosphere, but those meteorites collected in the last few decades from Antarctica are almost entirely pristine.

The different types of meteorites that originate from the asteroid belt cover almost all parts of the structure of differentiated bodies: meteorites even exist that come from the core-mantle boundary (pallasites). The combination of geochemistry and observational astronomy has also made it possible to trace the HED meteorites back to a specific asteroid in the main belt, 4 Vesta.

The comparatively few known Martian meteorites have provided insight into the geochemical composition of the Martian crust, although the unavoidable lack of information about their points of origin on the diverse Martian surface has meant that they do not provide more detailed constraints on theories of the evolution of the Martian lithosphere. As of July 24, 2013 65 samples of Martian meteorites have been discovered on Earth. Many were found in either Antarctica or the Sahara Desert.

During the Apollo era, in the Apollo program, 384 kilograms of lunar samples were collected and transported to the Earth, and three Soviet Luna robots also delivered regolith samples from the Moon. These samples provide the most comprehensive record of the composition of any Solar System body beside the Earth. The numbers of lunar meteorites are growing quickly in the last few years – as of
April 2008 there are 54 meteorites that have been officially classified as lunar.
Eleven of these are from the US Antarctic meteorite collection, 6 are from the Japanese
Antarctic meteorite collection, and the other 37 are from hot desert localities in Africa,
Australia, and the Middle East. The total mass of recognized lunar meteorites is close to
50 kg.

Planetary Geophysics and Space Physics

Space probes made it possible to collect data in not only the visible light region, but in other areas of the electromagnetic spectrum. The planets can be characterized by their force fields: gravity and their magnetic fields, which are studied through geophysics and space physics.

Measuring the changes in acceleration experienced by spacecraft as they orbit has allowed fine details of the gravity fields of the planets to be mapped. For example, in the 1970s, the gravity field disturbances above lunar maria were measured through lunar orbiters, which led to the discovery of concentrations of mass, mascons, beneath the Imbrium, Serenitatis, Crisium, Nectaris and Humorum basins.

If a planet's magnetic field is sufficiently strong, its interaction with the solar wind forms a magnetosphere around a planet. Early space probes discovered the gross dimensions of the terrestrial magnetic field, which extends about 10 Earth radii towards the Sun. The solar wind, a stream of charged particles, streams out and around the terrestrial magnetic field, and continues behind the magnetic tail, hundreds of Earth radii downstream. Inside the magnetosphere, there are relatively dense regions of solar wind particles, the Van Allen radiation belts.

Planetary geophysics includes, but is not limited to, seismology and tectonophysics, geophysical fluid dynamics, mineral physics, geodynamics, mathematical geophysics, and geophysical surveying.

Planetary geodesy

Planetary geodesy (also known as planetary geodetics) deals with the measurement and representation of the planets of the Solar System, their gravitational fields and geodynamic phenomena (polar motion in three-dimensional, time-varying space. The science of geodesy has elements of both astrophysics and planetary sciences. The shape of the Earth is to a large extent the result of its rotation, which causes its equatorial bulge, and the competition of geologic processes such as the collision of plates and of vulcanism, resisted by the Earth's gravity field. Some or all of these geologic principles can be applied to other planets besides Earth. The Earth geoid is essentially the figure of the Earth abstracted from its topographic features. Therefore, the Mars geoid (areoid is essentially the figure of Mars abstracted from its topographic features. Surveying and mapping are two important fields of application of geodesy.

Planetary Atmospheric science

The atmosphere is an important transitional zone between the solid planetary surface and the higher rarefied ionizing and radiation belts. Not all planets have atmospheres: their existence depends on the mass of the planet, and the planet's distance from the Sun – too distant and frozen atmospheres occur. Besides the four gas giant planets, almost all of the terrestrial planets (Earth, Venus, and Mars) have significant atmospheres. Two moons have significant atmospheres: Saturn's moon Titan and Neptune's moon Triton. A tenuous atmosphere exists around Mercury.

The effects of the rotation rate of a planet about its axis can be seen in atmospheric streams and currents. Seen from space, these features show as bands and eddies in the cloud system, and are particularly visible on Jupiter and Saturn.

Planetary oceanography

Exoplanetology

Exoplanetology studies exoplanets, the planets existing outside our Solar System. Until recently, the means of studying exoplanets have been extremely limited, but with the current rate of innovation in research technology, exoplanetology has become a rapidly developing subfield of astronomy.

Comparative planetary science

Planetary science frequently makes use of the method of comparison to give a greater understanding of the object of study. This can involve comparing the dense atmospheres of Earth and Saturn's moon Titan, the evolution of outer Solar System objects at different distances from the Sun, or the geomorphology of the surfaces of the terrestrial planets, to give only a few examples.

The main comparison that can be made is to features on the Earth, as it is much more accessible and allows a much greater range of measurements to be made. Earth analogue studies are particularly common in planetary geology, geomorphology, and also in atmospheric science.

The use of terrestrial analogues was first described by Gilbert (1886).

Professional activity

Journals

 Annual Review of Earth and Planetary Sciences
 Earth and Planetary Science Letters
 Earth, Moon, and Planets
 Geochimica et Cosmochimica Acta
 Icarus
 Journal of Geophysical Research – Planets
 Meteoritics and Planetary Science
 Planetary and Space Science
 The Planetary Science Journal

Professional bodies
 Division for Planetary Sciences (DPS) of the American Astronomical Society
 American Geophysical Union
 Meteoritical Society
 Europlanet

Major conferences
 Lunar and Planetary Science Conference (LPSC), organized by the Lunar and Planetary Institute in Houston. Held annually since 1970, occurs in March.
 Division for Planetary Sciences (DPS) meeting held annually since 1970 at a different location each year, predominantly within the mainland US.  Occurs around October.
 American Geophysical Union (AGU) annual Fall meeting in December in San Francisco.
 American Geophysical Union (AGU) Joint Assembly (co-sponsored with other societies) in April–May, in various locations around the world.
 Meteoritical Society annual meeting, held during the Northern Hemisphere summer, generally alternating between North America and Europe.
 European Planetary Science Congress (EPSC), held annually around September at a location within Europe.

Smaller workshops and conferences on particular fields occur worldwide throughout the year.

Major institutions
This non-exhaustive list includes those institutions and universities with major groups of people working in planetary science. Alphabetical order is used.

National space agencies
 Canadian Space Agency (CSA). Annual budget CAD $488.7 million (2013–2014).
 China National Space Administration (CNSA) (People's Republic of China). Budget $0.5–1.3 billion (est.).
 Centre national d'études spatiales French National Centre of Space Research,Budget €1.920 billion (2012).
 Deutsches Zentrum für Luft- und Raumfahrt e.V., (German: abbreviated DLR), the German Aerospace Center. Budget $2 billion (2010).
 European Space Agency (ESA). Budget $5.51 billion (2013).
 Indian Space Research Organisation (ISRO),
 Israel Space Agency (ISA),
 Italian Space Agency Budget ~$1 billion (2010).
 Japan Aerospace Exploration Agency (JAXA). Budget $2.15 billion (2012).
 NASA: Considerable number of research groups, including the JPL, GSFC, Ames. Budget $18.72 billion (2011).
 National Space Organization (Taiwan).
 Russian Federal Space Agency Budget $5.61 billion (2013).
 UK Space Agency (UKSA).

Other institutions

 Arctic Planetary Science Institute
 Arizona State University's School of Earth and Space Exploration
 The Australian National University's Planetary Science Institute
 Brown University Planetary Geosciences Group 
 Caltech's Division of Geological and Planetary Sciences and Planetary Sciences subdivision 
 Cornell University's  Space and Planetary Science
 Curtin University's School of Earth and Planetary Sciences
 Florida Institute of Technology's Department of Physics and Space Sciences
 Johns Hopkins University's Applied Physics Laboratory
 Lunar and Planetary Institute
 Max Planck Institute for Solar System Research's Department Planets and Comets
 MIT Dept. of Earth, Atmospheric and Planetary Sciences
 Open University Planetary and Space Sciences Research Institute
 Planetary Science Institute
 Stony Brook University's Geosciences Department and soon to open Center for Planetary Exploration
 UCL/Birkbeck's Centre for Planetary Sciences
 University of Arizona's Lunar and Planetary Lab
 University of Arkansas's Center for Space and Planetary Sciences
 University of California Los Angeles's Department of Earth, Planetary, and Space Sciences
 University of California Santa Cruz's Department of Earth & Planetary Sciences
 University of Hawaii's Hawaii Institute of Geophysics and Planetology
 University of Copenhagen's Center for Planetary Research
 University of Central Florida Planetary Sciences Group
 University of British Columbia Department of Earth, Ocean and Atmospheric Sciences
 University of Western Ontario's Centre for Planetary Science and Exploration
 University of Tennessee Department of Earth and Planetary Sciences
 University of Colorado's Department of Astrophysical and Planetary Sciences
 Washington University in St. Louis's Department of Earth and Planetary Sciences
 INAF – Istituto di Astrofisica e Planetologia Spaziali (it)

Basic concepts

 Asteroid
 Celestial mechanics
 Comet
 Dwarf planet
 Extrasolar planet
 Gas giant
 Icy moon
 Kuiper belt
 Magnetosphere
 Minor planet
 Planet
 Planetary differentiation
 Planetary system
 Definition of a planet
 Space weather
 Synestia
 Terrestrial planet

See also
 Areography (geography of Mars)
 Planetary cartography
 Planetary coordinate system
 Selenography – study of the surface and physical features of the Moon
 Theoretical planetology
 Timeline of Solar System exploration

References

Further reading
 Carr, Michael H., Saunders, R. S., Strom, R. G., Wilhelms, D. E. 1984. The Geology of the Terrestrial Planets. NASA.
 Morrison, David. 1994. Exploring Planetary Worlds. W. H. Freeman. 
 Hargitai H et al. (2015) Classification and Characterization of Planetary Landforms. In: Hargitai H (ed) Encyclopedia of Planetary Landforms. Springer.  https://link.springer.com/content/pdf/bbm%3A978-1-4614-3134-3%2F1.pdf
 Hauber E et al. (2019) Planetary geologic mapping. In: Hargitai H (ed) Planetary Cartography and GIS. Springer.
 Page D (2015) The Geology of Planetary Landforms. In: Hargitai H (ed) Encyclopedia of Planetary Landforms. Springer.
 Rossi, A.P., van Gasselt S (eds) (2018) Planetary Geology. Springer

External links

 Planetary Science Research Discoveries (articles)
 The Planetary Society (world's largest space-interest group: see also their active news blog)
 Planetary Exploration Newsletter (PSI-published professional newsletter, weekly distribution)
 Women in Planetary Science (professional networking and news)

 
Space science
Astronomical sub-disciplines